River Rats may refer to:

Albany River Rats, an ice hockey team in the American Hockey League!
River Rats, a Hardy Boys novel.
"River Rats", the seventh episode of All Grown Up!.